Gaston Mayor (born 29 February 1908, date of death unknown) was a French boxer. He competed in the men's lightweight event at the 1932 Summer Olympics.

References

1908 births
Year of death missing
French male boxers
Olympic boxers of France
Boxers at the 1932 Summer Olympics
People from Segovia
Sportspeople from the Province of Segovia
Lightweight boxers